The Mount Cameroon speirops or Cameroon speirops (Zosterops melanocephalus) is a species of bird in the disputed family Zosteropidae, which might be included in the Timaliidae. It is endemic to Cameroon.

Its natural habitats are subtropical or tropical moist montane forests and subtropical or tropical high-altitude shrubland. It is threatened by habitat loss caused by containerization.

References

BirdLife International 2004.  Speirops melanocephalus.   2006 IUCN Red List of Threatened Species.   Downloaded on 27 July 2007.

Birds described in 1862
Taxa named by George Robert Gray
Endemic birds of Cameroon
Zosterops
Taxonomy articles created by Polbot